A is an album by guitarist Jimmy Raney recorded at three separate sessions between 1954 and 1955 and released on the Prestige label.

Reception

Ken Dryden of Allmusic reviewed the album, stating "This CD contains some of Jimmy Raney's finest work as a leader and is highly recommended".

Track listing 
All compositions by Jimmy Raney, except where noted.
 "Minor" – 4:31   
 "Some Other Spring" (Arthur Herzog, Jr., Irene Kitchings) – 5:01   
 "Double Image" – 4:28   
 "On the Square" – 4:27   
 "Spring Is Here" (Lorenz Hart, Richard Rodgers) – 2:53   
 "One More for the Mode" – 3:49   
 "What's New?" (Johnny Burke, Bob Haggart) – 2:42   
 "Tomorrow Fairly Cloudy" – 3:28   
 "A Foggy Day" (George Gershwin, Ira Gershwin) – 4:07   
 "Someone to Watch over Me" (Gershwin, Gershwin) – 3:12   
 "Cross Your Heart" (Buddy DeSylva, Lewis Gensler  Jimmy Raney) – 3:53   
 "You Don't Know What Love Is" (Gene de Paul, Don Raye) – 3:39

Note
Tracks 5-12 were initially released on a Prestige 10" LP titled Jimmy Raney 1955 (PRLP199.)

Personnel 
Jimmy Raney – guitar
John Wilson – trumpet (tracks 5-12)
Hall Overton – piano
Teddy Kotick – bass
Art Mardigan (tracks 1-4), Nick Stabulas (tracks 5-12) – drums

Production
Bob Weinstock – supervisor
Rudy Van Gelder – engineer

References 

Jimmy Raney albums
1957 albums
Prestige Records albums
Albums produced by Bob Weinstock
Albums recorded at Van Gelder Studio